Beeline, earlier Bee Line GSM is a telecommunications brand by company PJSC VimpelCom, founded in Russia.

PJSC VimpelCom is Russia's third-largest wireless and second-largest telecommunications operator. Its headquarters is located in Moscow. Since 2009, PJSC VimpelCom has been a subsidiary of VimpelCom Ltd., which has become Veon in 2017. It is based in Amsterdam. VimpelCom's main competitors in Russia are Mobile TeleSystems, MegaFon and Tele2.

The commercial service was launched under the Beeline brand, a brand developed by Fabela in late 1993 to differentiate the company as a youthful and fun company, rather than a technical company. The name comes from the English term "beeline", meaning the most direct way between two points.

VimpelCom relaunched Beeline with the current characteristic black-and-yellow striped circle in 2005 with a campaign to associate the brand with the principles of brightness, friendliness, effectiveness, simplicity, and positive emotions; with a new slogan "Живи на яркой стороне" (Live on the bright side). The rebranding campaign was hugely successful and the principles associated with the brand "captured hearts and minds", in the words of the company.

History in Russia

OJSC VimpelCom was founded in 1992 and initially operated AMPS/D-AMPS network in Moscow area. In 1996 it became the first Russian company listed on the New York Stock Exchange.

In November 2005 OJSC VimpelCom stepped further with foreign acquisitions by acquiring 100% of Ukrainian RadioSystems, a marginal Ukrainian GSM operator operating under the Wellcom and Mobi brands. The deal has been surrounded by a controversy involving two major shareholders of VimpelCom: the Russian Alfa Group and Telenor, the incumbent Norwegian telecommunications company.

The company's current (as of July 2008) license portfolio covers a territory where 97% of Russia's population resides, as well as 100% of the territory of Kazakhstan, Ukraine, Uzbekistan, Tajikistan, Georgia, and Armenia. VimpelCom also has a 49.9% stake in Euroset, the largest mobile retailer in Russia and the Commonwealth of Independent States (CIS). In May 2010 VimpelCom merged with Kyivstar to form VimpelCom Ltd., the largest telecom operator group in the CIS. Alexander Izosimov, CEO of OJSC VimpelCom, was appointed president.

Outside Russia

Armenia

On 16 November 2006, PJSC VimpelCom acquired the 90% share in Armentel CJSC held by the Hellenic Telecommunications Organization SA (OTE) for €341.9 million.

Australia
In November 2018 it was observed that Beeline owns a range of 1000 numbers with the +61 country code, from +61497906000 to +61497906999. Unfortunately, numbers in this range have been used for a Technical support scam, posing as a Windows Help Desk in cold calls to Australian and New Zealand numbers.

Georgia

Beeline is active in Georgia. The first mobile call with Veon Georgia (brand Beeline) was initiated on March 15, 2007. From this time onward, the company has been actively developing and as of today it provides 1.3 million customers with 2G GSM 900/1800MHz, 3G 2100 MHz and 4G 800/1800 MHz wireless services.

Kazakhstan 
In 2004, PJSC VimpelCom, in its first move outside Russia's territory, acquired Kazakhstani cellular operator KaR-Tel (brand names K-Mobile and Excess).

Kyrgyzstan

Beeline is active in Kyrgyzstan and it is one of the most popular cellular carrier in Kyrgyzstan. The first call on GSM network of Kygyzstan was made on August 1st, 1998. In 2001 the trade name MobiCard was established that turned into brand Mobi in 2007. In 2009 company started to provide services under international brand Beeline. As for 2022 company provides services in standards of GSM-900/1800 and WCDMA/UMTS 2100/900 (3G) and LTE 800/1800/2100/2600 (4G).

Laos
In 2011 Beeline entered Laos as VimpelCom Lao, replacing former Tigo. 22% shareholding remains with Lao government. 3G HSPA+ services began in January 2012. Numbers on Beeline Laos are 020-7xxx-xxxx. Beeline Laos 4G LTE to be launched soon. Now it is on a trial period.

Ukraine 

Beeline Ukraine (known as Ukrainian RadioSystems (URS) before February 2007) was a mobile operator in Ukraine with 2.22 million GSM subscribers (February 2007). The company operated under Beeline brand. In 2010 Beeline merged with Kyivstar. Now all Beeline Ukraine subscribers became Kyivstar subscribers.

The company was founded in 1995, and Motorola acquired 49% of the company in 1996. URS obtained a GSM-900 license in 1997, but Motorola backed off the venture the same year due to an alleged government favoritism to another mobile operator. The Korean Daewoo picked up the ownership, didn't do much to grow the business and sold it to a Ukrainian financial group in 2003. In November 2005, 100% of the company's ownership was acquired by the Russian VimpelCom for $230 million. The deal was surrounded by a controversy involving two major shareholders of VimpelCom: the Russian Alfa Group and Telenor, a Norwegian telecom conglomerate.

Following the acquisition by VimpelCom, all of the company's services have been rebranded  as Beeline, similar to a VimpelCom's major mobile assets in Russia. In 2010 Beeline Ukraine (URS) was merged with Kyivstar. Now company operates only under Kyivstar brand.

Uzbekistan
Beeline is active in Uzbekistan and it is one of the most popular cellular carrier in Uzbekistan.

Vietnam
In July 2009 VimpelCom cooperated with a Vietnamese telecommunication company, GTel Telecommunications, to open a new mobile phone network in Vietnam called Beeline Vietnam. However, in 2012, after three years of business losses, Beeline withdrew from the joint venture and the Vietnamese market in general. Gtel Mobile continues to exploit the remaining base in Vietnam with a new brand, Gmobile.

References

External links 

 Investor relations web site
 Corporate web site

Russian brands
Telecommunications companies of Russia
Internet service providers of Russia
Streaming television
Mobile phone companies of Russia
Companies based in Moscow
Telecommunications companies established in 1993
VEON
 01
Telecommunications companies established in 1992
Telenor
Russian companies established in 1992
Russian companies established in 1993